Kleberg can refer to:

Places:
 Kleberg County, Texas
 Kleberg, Dallas, Texas

People (family name)
 Louis Kleberg
 Richard M. Kleberg
 Rudolph Kleberg
 Robert J. Kleberg (Soldier)
 Robert J. Kleberg (King Ranch)